A property designer or prop designer is a person who designs props for use in theatre, film, television, etc. Prop designers work in liaison with the costume designers, set designers and sound designers, under the direction of the art director or technical director.

However, the public seems to associate the term with home designer, or an interior designer, a person who is considered a professional in the field of interior design or one who designs interiors as part of their job.

 
 
Stage crew
Theatrical occupations